The United States Civil Service Commission  was a government agency of the federal government of the United States and was created to select employees of federal government on merit rather than relationships. In 1979, it was dissolved as part of the Civil Service Reform Act of 1978; the Office of Personnel Management and the Merit Systems Protection Board are the successor agencies.

History 
On March 3, 1871, President Ulysses S. Grant signed into law the first U.S. civil service reform legislation, which had been passed by Congress. The act created the United States Civil Service Commission, that was implemented by President Grant and funded for two years by Congress lasting until 1874. However, Congress which relied heavily on patronage, especially the Senate, did not renew funding of the Civil Service Commission. President Grant's successor, President Rutherford B. Hayes requested a renewal of funding but none was granted.

President Hayes' successor, James A. Garfield, advocated Civil Service reform. His efforts against the spoils system, also known as patronage, were cut short after he was assassinated by Charles J. Guiteau.

Pendleton law 
President Garfield's successor, President Chester A. Arthur, took up the cause of Civil Service reform and was able to lobby Congress to pass the Pendleton Civil Service Reform Act in 1883. The Pendleton law was passed in part following a public outcry over the assassination of President Garfield. The Pendleton Act renewed funding for the Civil Service Commission and established a three-man commission to run Civil Service whose commissioners were chosen by President Arthur. The Civil Service Commission administered the civil service of the United States federal government. The Pendleton law required certain applicants to take the civil service exam in order to be given certain jobs; it also prevented elected officials and political appointees from firing civil servants, removing civil servants from the influences of political patronage and partisan behavior. President Arthur and succeeding Presidents continued to expand the authority of the Civil Service Commission and federal departments that the Civil Service was covered. The Civil Service Commission, in addition to reducing patronage, also alleviated the burdensome task of the President of the United States in appointing federal office seekers.

Under the Commission Model, policy making and administrative powers were given to semi-independent commission rather than to the president. Reformers believed that a commission formed outside of the president’s chain of command would ensure that civil servants would be selected on the basis of merit system and the career service would operate in a politically neutral fashion. Civil Service Commissions typically consisted of three to seven individuals appointed by the chief executive on a bipartisan basis and for limited terms. Commissioners were responsible for direct administration of personnel system, including rule-making authority, administration of merit examinations, and enforcement of merit rules.

1953 Executive Order 
On April 27, 1953, President Eisenhower issued Executive Order 10450, which banned gay men and lesbians from working for any agency of the federal government, including the United States Civil Service Commission. It was not until 1973 that a federal judge ruled that a person's sexual orientation alone could not be the sole reason for termination from federal employment, and not until 1975 that the United States Civil Service Commission announced that they would consider applications by gays and lesbians on a case by case basis.

1978  reorganization 
Effective January 1, 1978, functions of the commission were split between the Office of Personnel Management  and the Merit Systems Protection Board under the provisions of Reorganization Plan No. 2 of 1978 (43 F.R. 36037, 92 Stat. 3783) and the Civil Service Reform Act of 1978.  In addition, other functions were placed under jurisdiction of the Equal Employment Opportunity Commission (EEOC), the Federal Labor Relations Authority (FLRA) and the Office of Special Counsel (OSC).

Chairmen of the commission

See also
United States civil service

References

External links 
 Guide to the United States Civil Service Commission Announcements and Other Papers 1949-1950

Civil service in the United States
Civil Service
National civil service commissions
Government agencies established in 1883
1883 establishments in the United States